Anita Mui Yim-fong (10 October 1963 – 30 December 2003) was a Hong Kong singer and actress who made major contributions to the Cantopop music scene and received numerous awards and honours. She remained an idol throughout her career, and is regarded as a Cantopop diva. She was dubbed as the "daughter of Hong Kong" and is considered one of the most iconic Cantopop singers.

Mui once held a sold-out concert in Hammersmith, London, England, where she was dubbed the "Madonna of the East", which brought her to further international fame. That title stayed with her throughout her career, in both Eastern and Western media.

In the 1980s, the gangtai style of music was revolutionised by Mui's wild dancing and on-stage femininity. She was famed for her outrageous costumes and high-powered performances in combination with contralto vocals, which are rare in female artists.

Her fan base reached far beyond Hong Kong into many parts of Asia, including Taiwan,  mainland China, Singapore and Malaysia, and other countries, as well. In the Hong Kong entertainment industry, where stars often rise and fall quickly, Mui remained in the spotlight for 21 years (1982–2003). Her career came to an abrupt end in 2003 when she announced she had cervical cancer. She died later that year at the age of 40. It was then understood that she had developed the disease due to a familial genetic disposition as her sister Ann had died of the same condition in 2000 at age 40 as well.

Life and career

1963–1978: Early years
 
Mui experienced much hardship in her childhood. She was born at Fa Yuen Street in Mong Kok, Kowloon. She is the youngest daughter in a family of four children. She is the only child born in Hong Kong in her family, as her brothers and sister were born in China. Her mother Mui Tam Mei-kam was born at Xiguan in Guangzhou. She was a Chinese medicine practitioner, who opened Yuet Wah Chinese Medical Clinic, Wah Geong Chinese and Western Music College, and a music brand in Hong Kong. Her siblings are Mui Kai-Ming (1952–), Mui Tak-Ming (1953–2015) and Ann Mui (1959–2000), who was also a singer. The children were raised in a single parent family. Mui's father died when she was very young. In some of her interviews, Mui mentioned that she had little memory of her father and the family were very poor. This meant that she had to help provide for her siblings at an early age, dropping out of school at the age of 13 or 14. More hardship followed the family when the bar that her mother ran was destroyed by a fire. To earn a living, Mui entered show business around the age of four with her sister Ann. She performed Chinese operas and pop songs in theatres and on the streets. Both Mui and her elder sister Ann performed in practically any nightclub that offered them a chance to make a living.

At the age of 15, due to the frequency of performances at different venues (up to six venues per day) that she had, her voice was affected due to the development of nodules on her vocal cords. Following the advice of the doctor, she took a year off and to keep herself occupied, she attended art lessons with her cousin. After a year, she started performing again despite the change in her vocal range, which lowered her voice by an octave.

1982–1989; 1994–2003: Singing and Acting
In 1982, as encouraged by her sister, Mui competed in the first New Talent Singing Awards. There, Mui got a big break by emerging champion with the song "The Windy Season" (風的季節), originally sung by Paula Tsui, beating over 3,000 contestants. Despite her title as "new talent" at that time, she had already been a singer for more than 10 years from street and club performances during her childhood.

As a reward for winning the New Talent contest at the time, Mui's first album was released with the local record company Capital Artists.

Her debut album, Debt Heart, drew a lukewarm response from the audience. However, her subsequent albums, Red (1983) and Leaping in the Spotlight (1984) fared much better, as she developed her personal style and image, with guidance and support from fashion designer Eddie Lau. In 1983 and 1984, she won the RTHK Top 10 Gold Songs awards back to back.

Her winning streak continued as she won another major award in 1985, her first top 10 Jade Solid Gold Best Female Singer award. Thereafter, she won the award every year until 1989. She was awarded the Gold Songs Gold Awards in 1989 for the ballad "Song of the Sunset", which became one of her signature songs throughout her career.

Mui released 50 albums in total. Her best-selling album was the 1985 "Bad Girl", which sold over 400,000 copies (platinum 8x by Hong Kong's standards). In her career, she sold 10 million albums.

In terms of live performances, in 1985, at the age of 21, her first concert was held lasting 15 nights (thus being one of the youngest singers to hold a concert at the Hong Kong Coliseum). Beginning in late 1987, a series of 28 consecutive concerts at the Coliseum was held through early 1988. This established a record at the time and dubbed Mui the title of "Ever Changing Anita Mui", which had become her trademark. Her popularity was also gaining prominence outside of Hong Kong, as she was invited to sing at the 1988 Summer Olympics opening ceremony in Seoul together with Janet Jackson as well as also performing her own solo with one of her hit songs of that year, "Blazing Red Lips (烈燄紅唇)". She performed in 300 concerts in her career. In 1995, Mui performed the song "Bad Girl" (a Cantonese cover of Sheena Easton's "Strut") in Guangzhou, China, where it was banned, as it was considered pornographic in nature. The government authorities in Guangzhou were infuriated when she chose to sing the song on the last day of her concert.

In 1990, during her birthday celebration with her fan club, Mui announced that she would put an end to receiving music awards to give a chance to newcomers. She held farewell concerts for 33 consecutive nights before retiring from the stage. At the age of 28, she stepped down from the industry, only to return from retirement in 1994. Mui mentored several Hong Kong newcomer singers who have since become successful, most notably Andy Hui, Denise Ho, Edmond Leung, the band Grasshopper, and Patrick Tam.

In 1998, aged 35, she was awarded the RTHK Golden Needle Award, being one of the youngest recipients to receive the award as a lifetime achievement.

1983–2002: Acting
Mui was also well known as an actress across Asia, as she starred in more than 40 films over a 20-year period. Her films were mainly of the action-thriller and martial arts variety, but she had also taken comedic and dramatic roles.

Her first acting award as a supporting actress was won at the Hong Kong Film Awards for her performance in Behind the Yellow Line (1984) alongside fellow Cantopop icon Leslie Cheung. Three years later in 1987, her performance in Stanley Kwan's Rouge, which also starred Cheung, won her the Best Actress Award at the Golden Horse Awards., as well as at the Hong Kong Film Awards in 1989. In the same year, she starred alongside Chow Yun-fat in Tsui Hark's A Better Tomorrow III: Love & Death in Saigon, which features her iconic ballad "Song of the Sunset". She also co-starred with Chow Yun-fat in the 1988 romantic comedy The Greatest Lover.

In 1990, she was cast in the titular role for Kawashima Yoshiko, a biopic of the flamboyant cross-dressing spy Yoshiko Kawashima based on the novel by Lilian Lee, who also authored the original novel and screenplay for Rouge. In 1992, she starred alongside comedy icon Stephen Chow in Justice, My Foot!, proving her calibre in the comedy genre. She also paired up with Stephen Chow in 1993 in Fight Back to School III. In the same year, she starred in The Heroic Trio with Michelle Yeoh and Maggie Cheung, and it proved to be one of her most popular action films. In 1994 and 1995, she found some international recognition by starring opposite Jackie Chan in The Legend of Drunken Master and Rumble in the Bronx. In 1996, she starred in Who's the Woman, Who's the Man with Leslie Cheung and Anita Yuen in a gender-bending love triangle story. 

Later, in 1997, she also won another best supporting actress at the Hong Kong Film Awards for her role in Eighteen Springs. In 2001, she starred in yet another Johnnie To comedy Wu Yen alongside Sammi Cheng and Cecilia Cheung as the lewd yet charming Emperor Qi. In 2002, she won Best Actress at the Changchun Film Festival Golden Deer Awards for Best Actress with her performance in July Rhapsody, which she starred alongside Jackie Cheung.

Mui was originally cast in Zhang Yimou's House of Flying Daggers (2004), but she resigned only two weeks before her death. Zhang had reserved her scenes to be shot last due to her poor health. Out of respect for Mui, Zhang did not cast another actress in the role and the character was removed from the screenplay. She received a dedication titled "In Memory of Anita Mui" during the closing credits.

Throughout her career, the tabloid magazines were unforgiving. Rumours relentlessly plagued Mui, who was accused of having tattoos on her arms and plastic surgery, and being addicted to drugs, suicidal and linked to the death of a triad leader in the 1980s and 1990s. Rumours of affairs with leading actors also circulated.

1989–2003: Politics, activism, philanthropy
Mui attended a local Hong Kong rally publicly calling for democracy during the 1989 Tiananmen Square protests that reportedly drew in 1 million people, which led to the founding of Hong Kong Alliance in Support of Patriotic Democratic Movements of China. She also performed in the 1989 Hong Kong concert for Chinese Democracy and vowed never to perform again in Mainland China. According to the posthumous memoirs of democracy activist Szeto Wah, Mui lent significant financial and material support to Operation Yellowbird, to help activists flee from China after the Tiananmen protests.

Mui was also actively involved in charitable projects throughout her career to give back to the community. After the Eastern China flood of 1991, she changed her political mind and took part with other Hong Kong stars in a Beijing concert to raise funds for victims of the catastrophe. 

The Tibetan red-crown Shamarpa (Of Kagyudpa Lineage) once said "She had a true heart. She was an unconventional woman and brought happiness to lots of people during her life." Her establishment of a nursing home in San Francisco, prompted the mayor of the city in 1992 to name 18 April as "Anita Mui Day". In 1993, she established the "Anita Mui True Heart Charity Foundation". That same year, she was also one of the founders of the Hong Kong Performing Artistes Guild. The Canadian city of Toronto declared 23 October 1993 to be "Anita Mui Day".

During the severe acute respiratory syndrome (SARS) outbreak, she initiated a fundraising concert titled the 1:99 Concert to raise money for SARS-affected families, which attracted famous fellow celebrities such as Andy Lau and Jacky Cheung. She was also awarded the "Fighting Against SARS Award" from RTHK and the newspaper Ming Pao. In 2003, she wrote and published the book The Heart of the Modern Woman. Profits from the book went to the Children's Cancer Foundation.

Personal life 
In 1990, Mui began dating Benjamin Lam Kwok-bun, who was a member of the Jackie Chan Stunt Team. The relationship ended three years later. Despite rumours of her dating several men, Mui remained single for the rest of her life.

Death and legacy

On 5 September 2003, Mui publicly announced that she had cervical cancer, from which her sister had also died. She held a series of eight shows at the Hong Kong Coliseum from 6–11 November and 14–15 November 2003, which were to be her last concerts before her death.

Her symbolic act was to "marry the stage", which was accompanied by her hit song "Sunset Melody" as she exited the stage. The last song she performed on stage was "Cherish When We Meet Again", a rendition of The Manhattans' "Let's Just Kiss And Say Goodbye" on 15 November 2003, where she was accompanied by her friends on stage. She eventually succumbed to cervical cancer and died of respiratory complications leading to lung failure at Hong Kong Sanatorium and Hospital on 30 December 2003 at 2:50 am Hong Kong Time. She was 40 years old. Thousands of fans turned out for her funeral at North Point in January 2004. Mui was cremated and her ashes are interred at the Po Lin Monastery's mausoleum on Lantau Island.

In 1998, an ATV-produced television series Forever Love Song told a story of a character which was loosely based on that of Mui, but the character names were purposely changed. In 2007, a television series was produced in China titled Anita Mui Fei to tell the story of her life. The 42-episode series was broadcast by China Education Television. Some subjects, such as her suffering from cancer, Leslie Cheung's suicide and her mother's real estate dilemma, were avoided. Alice Chan portrayed Mui in the series.

On 23 September 2004, the Anita Mui True Heart Digital Multimedia Studio was opened at the University of Hong Kong. It included state-of-the-art equipment for digital audio and video editing. In Causeway Bay, an Anita Mui-themed cafe called Happiness Moon is also dedicated to her legacy.

On 11 October 2008, a show on TVB, titled Our Anita Mui, was dedicated to Mui. Many fans and off-stage personnel who worked with her had a chance to talk about their personal experiences with Mui. Singers who participated in the show included Andy Hui, Edmond Leung, and Stephanie Cheng. 
On 18 July 2014, a statue of Anita Mui was unveiled on Hong Kong's Avenue of Stars.

In 2019, she was the subject of the film Dearest Anita. The film centered around individuals whose lives had been shaped by her work, including her fans and beneficiaries of her philanthropic work.  

In 2021, she was portrayed in the biopic Anita, directed by Longman Leung. She was played by the Hong Kong model Louise Wong.

Will 
In her will, Mui bequeathed two properties to her fashion designer, Eddie Lau, and the remainder to the Karen Trust – a trust she had set up and looked after by HSBC International Trustees. Its beneficiaries included her mother, and four nieces and nephews. The Karen Trust provided Tam with a life tenancy of HK$70,000 per month; upon Tam's death, the estate would go to the New Horizon Buddhist Association.

In 2005, Tam received a HK$705,000 lump-sum payment from the trust in May. She applied for and obtained a hardship grant to pay for medical expenditure of $50,000 in December; her application for funds from the estate to challenge the will was denied. In 2008, Mui's estate was estimated to be worth HK$100 million. Tam Mei-kam contested the will, arguing that Mui was mentally unfit when she executed her will in 2003, weeks before her death. The High Court ruled that Mui was of sound mind when she signed the will, and that she simply did not trust her mother with money.

Over the years, Tam mounted several legal challenges to the will, and succeeded in having the life tenancy varied to HK$120,000. Tam was reportedly owing $2 million in legal costs in 2011. A fresh appeal by Tam and Mui's elder brother Peter Mui Kai-ming failed at the Court of Final Appeal in May 2011.

After that challenge, the Court of First Instance of Hong Kong declared Tam bankrupt on 25 April 2012 for failing to pay legal fees, whilst allowing her to continue receiving her monthly allowance. In January 2013, the court ruled that the monthly tenancy of HK$120,000 to Tam, suspended since the previous July, would continue to be frozen due to mounting debts of the estate. Her brother was declared bankrupt on 17 January 2013 for failing to pay legal fees relating to the appeals. In May 2013, the court ordered the estate to pay Tam HK$20,000 a month for her living costs, as well as $240,000 to settle her overdue rent.

Discography
Usually, English translations of Chinese titles from AnitaMuiNet.com are used. However, some English titles are different from the website, and some other albums are romanised in case accurate translation may not be possible.

Studio albums

Cantonese
Capital Artists Ltd.
 Sum chai (Debts of the Heart)  (1982)
 Also includes solo recordings by members of the Hong Kong pop band, Siu Foo Deui (The Tigers) 
 Red Anita Mui  (Chek sik Mui Yim-fong) (1983)
 Sometimes referred as Red  (Chek sik)
 Leaping in the Spotlight  (Fei yeok mou toi) (1984)
 Chi seoi lau nin (The Years Flow Like Water)  (1985)
 Bad Girl  (Waai neoi haai) (1985)
 Yiu neoi (Temptress)  (1986)
 Burning Tango  (Tsi fo taam gwo) (1987)
 Flaming Red Lips  (Leet yim hung seon) (1987)
 Mung leoi gung tzeoi (Drunk in Dreams Together)  (1988)
 Mellow  (Zeoi yun tsing waai) (1988)
 We'll Be Together — EP (1988)
 Lady  (Sook neoi) Artists Ltd. (1989)
 In Brasil (sometimes referred as In Brazil) (1989)
 Say It If You Love Me  (Ngoi ngo been soot ngoi ngo ba) (1989)
 Cover Girl  (Fung meen neoi long) (1990)
 Anita Mui (1991)
 Sometimes it is called Yook mong ye sau gaai (Jungle of Desire) 
 It's Like This  (Si tze yeung dik) (1994)
 Sometimes, it is referred to as This Is Anita Mui  (Mui Yim Fong si tze yeung dik)
 The Woman of Songs 歌之女 (Goh tzi neoi) (1995)
 Illusions  (Geng faa seoi yu) (1997)
 Variations  (Been tzau) (1998)
 Larger Than Life (1999)
 I'm So Happy (2000)

Go East Entertainment Co. Ltd.
 With (2002)

Japanese
English titles are official English titles used by record labels for below releases:
Express (part of EMI Japan)
 Fantasy of Love / Debt of Love  (kuchibiru woubau mae ni / inochi hate rumade) — EP (1983)
 "Fantasy of Love" is the Japanese version of the Cantonese song "Gau cheut ngo dik sum". "Debt of Love" is the Japanese version of the Cantonese song "Sum chai".
 Marry Me Merry Me / nantonaku shiawase  (nichii hanayome / nantonaku shiawase) — EP (1983)
 Marry Me Merry Me is sometimes referred as Marry Me Marry Me.

Mandarin
Rock Records
 Manjusaka  (Man zhu sha hua) (1986)
 Ever-changing Anita Mui: Flaming Red Lips  (Bai bian Mei Yan-fang: lieyan hong chun) (1988)
 Intimate Lover  (Qinmi airen) (1991)

Other record labels
 Caution  (Xiaoxin) — Capital Artists Ltd. (1994)
 Hong Kong edition of this album consists of Cantonese versions of some Mandarin songs.
 Flower Woman  (Nüren hua) — Music Impact Ltd. (1997)

Anita Music Collection Ltd.
 Moonlight on My Bed (or simply "Moonlight")  (Chuang qian ming yueguang) (1998)
 Nothing to Say  (Mei huashuo) (1999)

Concert albums
Capital Artists Ltd.
 Anita Mui in Concert 87–88  – Cantonese (1988)
 Anita in Concert '90  – Cantonese (1990)
 Anita Mui Live in Concert 1995  – Cantonese/Mandarin (1995)
 Anita Mui Final Concert 1992  – Cantonese/Mandarin (2006)

Music Impact Ltd.
 Anita Mui 1997 Live in Taipei  – Mandarin (1997)
Music Nation Records Company Ltd.
 Anita Mui Fantasy Gig 2002  – Cantonese/Mandarin (2002)

Compilation albums
Compilations released after 2004 are not included here:
Capital Artists Ltd. (Cantonese)
 The Legend of the Pop Queen: Part I and Part II (1992)
 Lifetime of Fantasies  (Ching waan yat sang) (1993)
 Change  (Been) (1993)
 Wong tze tzi fung (Majestic)  (1993)
 Dramatic Life  (Hei kek yan sang) (1993)
 Love Songs  (Ching goh) (1997)
 Love Songs II  II (Ching goh II) (1998)
 Anita's 45 Songs  (2001)
 Tribute to Anita Mui  (2004)
 Faithfully  (2008)
 In the Memories of Anita Mui  (2013)

Other record labels
 Anita Classic Moment Live  – Mui Music Ltd. (Cantonese/Mandarin) (2004)
 Anita Mui Forever  – BMG Taiwan Inc. (Mandarin) (2004)

Singles

1980s

1990s

2000s

Tour setlists

留住你今晚
點起你欲望
魅力的散發
心債
赤的疑惑
交出我的心
信
24小時之吻 (梅艷芳、草蜢 合唱)
祝你好運 (梅艷芳、草蜢 合唱)
小虎子闖世界 (梅艷芳、小虎隊 合唱)
歌衫淚影
殘月碎春風
Medley:
再共舞
紗籠女郎
再共舞 Reprise
滾滾紅塵
IQ博士
風的季節 (梅艷芳、梅愛芳 合唱)
中國戲曲
The Way We Were
待嫁女兒心
日本演歌 (梅艷芳、黎小田 合唱)
合唱歌 (梅艷芳、Guest 合唱)
夢伴
別離的無奈
冰山大火
幻影
蔓珠莎華
夢幻的擁抱
抱你十個世紀
孤身走我路
壞女孩
顛多一千晚
似水流年
不了情
逝去的愛

Medley:
冰山大火
征服他
心魔
冰山大火 Reprise
痴痴愛一次
緋聞中的女人
妖女
將冰山劈開
愛將 (梅艷芳、草蜢 合唱)
飛躍千個夢 (草蜢 主唱)
戀之火
殘月醉春風
夢
紗籠女郎
Medley:
嘆息
歌衫淚影
千枝針刺在心
胭脂扣
夢伴
壞女孩
放鬆
暫時厭倦
蔓珠莎華
她的前半生
烈燄紅唇
尋愛
Oh No! Oh Yes!
裝飾的眼淚
無淚之女
似火探戈
魅力的天橋
最後一次
傷心教堂
似水流年
珍惜再會時

愛我便說愛我吧
正歌
第四十夜
夏日戀人
一舞傾情
難得有情人
愛情基本法
心窩已瘋
心仍是冷 (梅艷芳、倫永亮 合唱)
明天你是否依然愛我 (梅艷芳、倫永亮 合唱)
你知道我在等你嗎 (倫永亮獨唱)
Stand By Me
Dancing Boy
玫瑰、玫瑰、我愛你
不如不見
最愛是誰
倦
夢裡共醉 (音樂/舞蹈)
焚心以火
脂胭扣
黑夜的豹
Medley:
壞女孩
妖女
烈燄紅唇
淑女
封面女郎
她的前半生
孤身走我路
龍的傳人
血染的風采
蔓珠莎華
夕陽之歌
耶利亞
Encore:
似水流年
心債
夢伴
冰山大火
我未失方向
赤的疑惑
再共舞
珍惜再會時

蔓珠莎華
Faithfully
夢幻的擁抱
夢姬
妖女
緋聞中的女人
假如我是男人
Touch
似火探戈
不信愛有罪
這一個夜
Jungle Medley:
黑夜的豹
慾望野獸街
夜貓夫人
慾望野獸街 Reprise
教父的女人
壞女孩
胭脂扣
啼笑因緣
每當變幻時
似是故人來
幾多
逝去的愛
赤的疑惑
夕陽之歌
親密愛人
IQ博士
似水流年
心肝寶貝
孤身走我路
夢伴
Stand By Me
珍惜再會時
回頭已是百年身

封面女郎 Introduction
Medley:
淑女
壞女孩
夢伴
妖女
親密愛人
Medley:
新鴛鴦蝴蝶夢
只羡鴛鴦不羡仙
女人心
激光中
黑夜的豹
放開你的頭腦
感激
珍惜再會時

Overture
夢伴
We'll Be Together
Faithfully
愛是沒餘地
傳說 Interlude
莫問一生
烈女
耶利亞
夢姬
等著你回來 Interlude
得不到的愛情
Medley:
何日
李香蘭
何日 Reprise
願今宵一起醉死
Interlude
Stand By Me
是這樣的
Medley:
愛是個傳奇
粉紅色的一生
明星
女人心
Medley: (梅艷芳、倫永亮 合唱)
分分鐘需要你
浪子心聲
胭脂扣
情人
明天我要嫁給你
憑著愛
心仍是冷
分分鐘需要你 Reprise
情歸何處
感激
Interlude
Touch
疾風
愛我便說愛我吧
歌之女
似水流年

是這樣的
艷舞台
淑女
抱緊眼前人
愛上狼的羊
女人心
愛的感覺
緋聞中的女人
Touch
壞女孩
似水流年
Medley:
似是故人來
心肝寶貝
胭脂扣
緣份
有心人
路...始終告一段
何日
夕陽之歌
夜蛇
烈艷紅唇
抱你十個世紀
眼中釘
一生何求
似夢迷離
但願人長久
不快不吐
Medley:
你真美麗
第二春
夢
戀之火
今宵多珍重
我要
給我一個吻
玫瑰、玫瑰、我愛你
情歸何處
你留我在此
將冰山劈開
床前明月光
心窩已瘋
Big Bad Girl
夢伴

Opening
Stand By Me
將冰山劈開
愛我便說愛我吧
長藤掛銅鈴
Medley:
艷舞台
烈焰紅唇
Medley:
憑甚麼
假如我是男人
黑夜的豹
蔓珠莎華
Oh No! Oh Yes!
Wonderful Night
Faithfully
是這樣的
夢幻的擁抱
夢姬
烈女
心債
一舞傾情
約會
胭脂扣
床前明月光
心窩已瘋
芳華絕代
床呀！床！
似水流年
似是故人來
抱緊眼前人
親密愛人
Medley:
孤身走我路
夕陽之歌　
Medley:
愛將
壞女孩
淑女
妖女
放開你的頭腦
夢伴
冰山大火

Overture
夢裡共醉
是這樣的
抱緊眼前人
心肝寶貝
Medley:
何日
李香蘭
何日 Reprise
心債
第四十夜
夏日戀人
'O Sole Mio
親密愛人
Medley:
愛情的代價
我願意
似夢迷離
今生今世
深愛著你
孤身走我路
胭脂扣
似是故人來
似水流年
Sukiyaki
花月佳期
夕陽之歌

Awards
New Talent Singing Awards winner 1982
Top 10 Jade Solid Gold Best Female Singer Award 1985–1989
Top 10 Jade Solid Gold Gold Song Gold Award for Sunset Melody 1989
Hong Kong Film Awards for Best Supporting Actress 1985 for Behind the Yellow Line
Golden Horse Award for Best Leading Actress 1988 for Rouge
Asia-Pacific Film Festival Awards for Best Actress 1989 for Rouge
Hong Kong Film Award for Best Actress 1989 for Rouge
Hong Kong Film Awards for Best Supporting Actress 1998 for Eighteen Springs
Golden Bauhinia Awards for Best Supporting Actress 1998 for Eighteen Springs
RTHK Golden Needle Award 1998
Golden Deer Awards for Best Actress 2002 for July Rhapsody

Concert tours/specials

Filmography

TV series

TVB

See also
 Asteroid 55384 Muiyimfong
 Music of Hong Kong
 Cinema of Hong Kong

References

External links

 

 

New Talent Singing Awards contestants
1963 births
2003 deaths
Deaths from cervical cancer
Deaths from cancer in Hong Kong
20th-century Hong Kong women singers
21st-century Hong Kong women singers
20th-century Hong Kong actresses
21st-century Hong Kong actresses
Cantopop singers
Hong Kong Mandopop singers
Hong Kong television actresses
Hong Kong film actresses
Hong Kong Buddhists
Hong Kong idols
Hong Kong contraltos
Hong Kong women comedians